The Amitabha Pure Land Rebirth Dhāraṇī, sometimes called the Pure Land Rebirth Mantra is considered an important mantra or dhāraṇī in Pure Land Buddhism and other schools of Buddhism, mainly following the Mahayana tradition. The full name of this mantra is the Dhāraṇī for pulling out the fundamental cause of karmic obstacles and obtaining rebirth in the Pure Lands (Chinese: 拔一切業障根本得生淨土陀羅尼). It is also known as Pure Land Rebirth Dhāraṇī (Chinese: 往生淨土神咒; Wang Sheng Jing Tu Shen Zhou), or Rebirth Mantra (Chinese: 往生咒; Wang Sheng Zhou) for short.

Reciting this mantra is believed to grant the reciter a peaceful and joyful life in this life, and allow them to be reborn into the Buddha Amitabha's buddha-field of Ultimate Bliss. It can also be recited to help the spirits of the animals that a person has killed in the past, including poultry, game, aquatic creatures, insects, etc. to ascend to a higher spiritual realm.

Background 
The mantra was translated from Sanskrit into Chinese by Guṇabhadra (Sanskrit; Chinese: 求那跋陀羅, 394-468) from central India. It is usually recited 21, 27 or 49 times per day. In one type of group practice, participants usually recite this mantra three times after reciting the Heart Sutra or the Amitabha Sutra.

The word "rebirth" tends to make people think that this mantra is only about "being reborn", and that it can only serve the particular purpose of going to the Pure Land. However, another positive and important function and meaning of this mantra is the "pulling out the fundamental cause of karmic obstacles". It brings about benefits for the reciter in this present life.

Popular text

Short Version 
Sanskrit: 
 namo amitābhāya tathāgatāya
 tadyathā 
 amṛtadbhave
 amṛtasaṃbhave
 amṛtavikrānte
 amṛtavikrānta 
 gāmine gagana kīrtakare svāhā

English:Homage to Amitābha ("Infinite Light") Tathagata ("He who has gone to Thusness").

Thus: 

O producer of immortality (amrita),

O he whose state of existence is immortality,

O he who transcends immortality,

O he who transcends immortality, 

O sky goer, O fame maker (or "O he who moves in the glory of the sky"), Hail!Some versions have amṛtasiddhaṃbhave ("O he whose state of existence has accomplished deathlessness") instead of amṛtasaṃbhave.

Alternative Sanskrit versions: 
Oskar Von Hinuber cites other versions from Central Asia such as: namo amitābhāya tathāgatāya tadyathā amṛ[te am]ṛto-bhate amṛtasaṃbhave amitagaganakīrtakare svāhāand namo amitābhāya tathāgatāya tadyathā maṛte phu amṛte phu amṛtaviśodhane phu svāhā

Chinese with Back-transcription 
From CBETA's Gunabhadra edition (Taisho 0368):  

南無 阿彌多婆夜 哆他伽哆夜
namo amitābhāya tathāgatāya
哆地夜他
tadyathā
阿彌利都婆毘
amṛtodbhave
阿彌利哆悉眈 婆毘
amṛtasiddhaṃ bhave　
阿彌利哆毘迦蘭諦
amṛtavikrānte
阿彌利哆毘迦蘭哆
amṛtavikrānta　
伽彌膩　伽伽那 枳多迦隷
gāmine gagana kīrtakare
莎婆訶
svāhā

Long Version 
The Sanskrit titles of this long version is Sarvatathāgatāyurvajrahṛdaya-dhāraṇī. 

Sanskrit:  Namo ratnatrayāya  

Nama āryāmitābhāya

tathāgatāyārhate saṃyaksaṃbuddhāya

Tadyathā: 

oṃ amṛte amṛtodbhave amṛtasaṃbhave amṛtagarbhe

amṛtasiddhe amṛtateje amṛtavikrānte

amṛtavikrāntagāmini amṛtagaganakīrtikari

amṛtadun-dubhisvare sarvārthasādhani

sarvakarmakleśakṣayaṃkari svāhāEnglish:Homage to the Three Jewels, 

Homage to the noble Amitabha (Infinite Light),

to the Tathāgata, the Arhat, the completely and perfectly awakened one (samyaksambuddha).

Thus: 

Oṃ O immortality (amrta), O maker of immortality! O born of immortality! O essence/embryo (garbha) of immortality!

O immortality perfecting one! O the brilliance (teja) of immortality! O he who goes beyond immortality!

O he who goes beyond immortality and whose glory is infinite as the sky (amṛtagaganakīrtikare)

O sound of the drum of immortality realizing (sadhane) benefit for all.

O he who destroys (ksayam) all karmic afflictions. Hail!

Other versions 

An even longer expanded version was discovered in Dunhuang's Mogao Caves by Aurel Stein(1862–1943) which contains the core long version of the dhāraṇī (in the Siddham script) with further additions (such as the mantra of light) and dates to the Five Dynasties (926–975 CE) era.  

According to Gergely Hidas, the xylograph was likely "produced to serve as amulets". He further adds that "as for the sequence of the incantations, after the prime dhāraṇī dedicated to the depicted deity, further formulas are included most probably to enhance the efficacy of the amulet. The designers of these talismans are likely to have been monastic people with knowledge of Sanskrit and an understanding of the spells used. These objects were probably meant for a Chinese-speaking lay clientele in exchange for donations and must have been folded, wrapped and worn on the body."

Sanskrit 
 

Gergely Hidas' critical edition of the Sanskrit text is as follows:  [1] namo ratnatrayāya | nama āryāmitābhāya tathāgatāyārhate saṃyaksaṃbuddhāya | tadyathā | 

oṃ amṛte amṛtodbhave amṛtasaṃbhave amṛtagarbhe amṛtasiddhe amṛtateje amṛtavikrānte amṛtavikrāntagāmini amṛtagaganakīrtikari amṛtadun-dubhisvare sarvārthasādhani sarvakarmakleśakṣayaṃkari svāhā |

[2] oṃ amoghavairocanamahāmudrāmaṇipadmajvāla pravartaya hūṃ|

[3] oṃ bhara bhara saṃ bhara saṃbhara indriyaviśodhani hūṃ hūṃ ruru cale svāhā | 

[4] namo bhagavatoṣ ṇīṣāya | oṃ ruru sphuru jvala tiṣ ṭha siddhalocane sarvārthasādhani svāhā | 

[5] ye dharmā hetuprabhavā hetuṃ teṣāṃ tathāgato hy avadat teṣāṃ ca yo nirodha evaṃvādī mahāśramaṇaḥ |

[6] oṃ vajrakrodhana hūṃ jaḥ |

[7] oṃ vajrāyuṣe svāhā |

English 
Hidas' English translation (with the titles of each dharani / mantra):  

1. Obeisance to the Three Jewels and Amitābha, The SarvatathāgatāyurvajrahṛdayadhāraṇīVeneration to the Three Jewels. Veneration to the noble Amitābha, the Tathāgata, the Arhat, the Perfectly Awakened One. Namely, Oṃ O Immortality, O the One Arisen from Immortality, O Immortality-born, O Immortality-child, O Immortality-perfect, O Immortality-power, O Immortality-valour, O the One Acting by Immortality-valour, O Immortality-sky-fame-maker, O Immortality-kettledrum-sound, O the One who Accomplishes all Aims, O Destroyer of all Defilements originating from [bad] Actions svāhā.2. The Prabhāsa-mantra (Mantra of Light, Chin. Guangming zhenyan, Jap. Komyo Shingon) Oṃ O Light of the Jewel-lotus that is the Great Seal of the Unfailing Vairocana advance hūṃ.3. The Mahāpratisarā-upahṛdayavidyāOṃ provide, provide, support, support, O Purifier of the Abilities, hūṃ hūṃ ruru cale svāhā.4. Obeisance to Uṣṇīṣa. The Tathāgatalocanā-mahāvidyāVeneration to the glorious Uṣṇīṣa. oṃ ruru sphuru shine, stand by, O the One with Accomplished Eyes, O the One who Accomplishes all Aims svāhā.5. The Pratītyasamutpāda-gāthāThose dharmas which arise from a cause, the Tathāgata has declared their cause, and that which is the cessation of them. Thus the great renunciant has taught.6. The Ucchuṣma-mantraOṃ O Vajrakrodhana hūṃ jaḥ7. The Āyurvardhanī-vidyā (the formula which increases long life) of Vajrāyus Oṃ svāhā to Vajrāyus.The Chinese text printed on the side of the dhāraṇī states: This Great Vow [spell] of the Infinite Life [Buddha] is enormous and extensive.The Wish-fulfilling [spell] is [like] whatever your heart wishes, it will necessarily follow. The Buddha Eye Mother [spell] is extraordinarily auspicious. The Consecrated Light [spell] can destroy the bad paths [of rebirth]. The dragon-spirits [will] protect the place where the Ucchuṣma-mantra is put. As for the Verse of the Dharma-body, those who wear it at the waist will be equal to the Buddhas. The four assemblies are universally encouraged to keep and wear this [amulet] to create a karmic basis [for a good future] and it is also avowed that they [will] ascend together to the true and eternal wonderful fruit.

See also 
 Amitābha

References 

Buddhist mantras
Mahayana texts
Pure Land Buddhism